Travellers by Night is an anthology of horror stories edited by American writer August Derleth. It was released in 1967 by Arkham House in an edition of 2,486 copies.  None of the stories had been previously published.

Contents

Travellers by Night contains the following tales:

 "The Cicerones", by Robert Aickman
 "Episode on Cain Street", by Joseph Payne Brennan
"The Cellars", by J. Ramsey Campbell
 "The Man Who Rode the Trains", by Paul A. Carter
 "A Handful of Silver", by Mary Elizabeth Counselman
 "Denkirch", by David Drake
 "The Wild Man of the Sea", by William Hope Hodgson
 "The Unpleasantness at Carver House", by Carl Jacobi
 "The Terror of Anerley House School", by Margery Lawrence
"The Horror From the Middle Span", by H. P. Lovecraft and August Derleth
"Not There", by John Metcalfe
"Family Tree", by Frank D. Thayer, Jr.
"Death of a Bumblebee", by H. Russell Wakefield
"The Crater", by Donald Wandrei

Sources

1967 anthologies
Fantasy anthologies
Horror anthologies